This page shows the results of the Sport Shooting Competition at the 2003 Pan American Games, held from August 2 to August 9 in Santo Domingo, Dominican Republic.

Men's competition

50 m Pistol
Held on 2003-08-05

25 m Rapid Fire Pistol
Held on 2003-08-07

10 m Air Pistol
Held on 2003-08-02

50 m Rifle 3 Positions
Held on 2003-08-09

50 m Rifle Prone
Held on 2003-08-07

10 m Air Rifle
Held on 2003-08-04

50 m Running Target
Held on 2003-08-08

Trap
Held on 2003-08-03

Double Trap
Held on 2003-08-06

Skeet
Held on 2003-08-09

Women's competition

25 m Pistol
Held on 2003-08-08

10 m Air Pistol
Held on 2003-08-03

50 m Rifle 3 Positions
Held on 2003-08-06

10 m Air Rifle
Held on 2003-08-02

Trap
Held on 2003-08-04

Double Trap
Held on 2003-08-05

Skeet
Held on 2003-08-07

Medal table

See also
Shooting at the 2004 Summer Olympics

References
 Sports 123

P
2003
Events at the 2003 Pan American Games
Shooting competitions in the Dominican Republic